The Societas Linguistica Europaea (SLE) is a Europe-focused professional society for linguists. It was founded in 1966 to advance linguistics, the scientific study of human language. The SLE has over 1,000 individual members and welcomes linguists of all kinds. Through its website, its annual meetings, and its journals Folia Linguistica and Folia Linguistica Historica, the SLE works to disseminate current research in linguistics and facilitate communication within the discipline.

The first president of the SLE was André Martinet, elected in 1966. Particularly active members in the first decades were Werner Winter (president in 1991) and Jacek Fisiak (president in 1972 and 1982). In the years before 1990, the SLE was an important meeting place for linguists from western Europe and eastern Europe. Meetings and presidents alternated between western Europe and eastern Europe.

Publications
The SLE publishes two journals, Folia Linguistica (on all areas of general linguistics) and Folia Linguistica Historica (specifically on historical linguistics).

Meetings
The SLE organizes an annual four-day conference in the summer, with a program of talks, plenary speakers, symposia, and poster sessions for researchers to share their work. In 2020 and 2021, the Annual Meetings of the SLE took place digitally, due to the COVID-19 restrictions on traveling and gatherings. The 53rd Annual Meeting did not take place as originally planned, from 26 to 29 August 2020 at the University of Bucharest. As a result the 55th Annual Meeting is now expected to take place from 24 to 27 August 2022 at the University of Bucharest.

Presidents 

The following persons have been president of the Societeas Linguistica Europaea:

References

External links
 SLE website
 Folia Linguistica, a journal of the SLE
 Folia Linguistica Historica, a journal of the SLE

Linguistic societies
1996 establishments in Europe